Laban is a figure in the First Book of Nephi, near the start of the Book of Mormon, a scripture of the Latter Day Saint movement. Unlike many of the other Book of Mormon characters, Laban neither ends up in the New World, nor is he a Biblical character. Although Laban only makes a brief appearance in the narrative, his brass plates would later play an important role amongst the Nephites, who are the book's main protagonists.

Background
In the book of First Nephi, chapters three and four, Laban is described as a notable citizen of Jerusalem who commanded great wealth and many servants.  Among his possessions was a set of brass plates containing the genealogy of Lehi, a major character in the early portion of the Book of Mormon.  Lehi, having left the city with his family in response to God's command, enjoined his four sons to return to Jerusalem and retrieve them: "For behold, Laban hath the record of the Jews and also a genealogy of my forefathers, and they are engraven upon plates of brass."  Lehi furthermore stated that this injunction did not originate with himself, but with the Lord, who had spoken to him on this matter in a dream.

Retrieving Laban's brass record
Lehi's two older sons, Laman and Lemuel, were reluctant to obey their father's order at first, fearful of Laban's power and ruthless reputation.  However, Lehi's fourth son, Nephi, vowed that he would obey God's command: "For I know that the Lord giveth no commandments unto the children of men, save he shall prepare a way for them that they may accomplish the thing which he commandeth them."  Accordingly, the four sons of Lehi set out for Jerusalem.

First, Laman went to Laban alone to request the records, but Laban cast Laman out of his house and threatened to kill him.  Next, Nephi and his brothers offered all of their families valuables that they had left behind in Jerusalem after they had fled into the wilderness, to Laban in return for the brass plates.  The Book of Mormon then states that Laban "did lust" after their wealth and "thrust" Nephi and his brothers from his house, but then sent his servants to kill them. In their haste to escape with their lives, Lehi's sons had to abandon their families goods and flee, thus allowing Laban to take possession of their families’ wealth.

After fleeing Jerusalem, the elder brothers Laman and Lemuel were angry with Lehi and their younger, more faithful, brothers Sam and Nephi, so they beat their siblings with rods.  Suddenly, an angel appeared, commanding the elder duo to desist and all of them to return forthwith to the city, where Laban would fall into their hands.  Laman and Lemuel demurred: "Behold, he is a mighty man, and he can command fifty, yea, even he can slay fifty; then why not us?"  Though Nephi encouraged his brothers by reminding them of God's might, it was only with great reluctance that they agreed to press on.

Undaunted, Nephi slipped back into Jerusalem alone that night, where he soon found Laban lying unconscious in a drunken stupor.  The Spirit of God told Nephi to kill Laban with his own sword and seize the records, saying "It is better that one man should perish than that a nation should dwindle and perish in unbelief."  After complying, Nephi disguised himself as Laban and headed towards Laban's treasury where the brass plates were kept.  On the way there he found one of Laban's servants, Zoram, whom he commanded to retrieve the brass plates and to follow him out of the city.  Zoram obeyed, and once outside the city, Nephi revealed that he was not Laban, and he and his brothers convinced Zoram to join them and their family in their journey to the New World.

The content of the brass plates
Upon returning to his family in the wilderness, Nephi turned over the "Plates of Laban" to Lehi, who made a complete inspection of them.  Lehi determined that the plates contained:

The Five Books of Moses (the Jewish Torah);
A history of the Jewish people, down to the reign of [then current] King Zedekiah;
The prophecies of the Israelite prophets down to Jeremiah, seen in the Book of Mormon as a contemporary of Lehi; and
A genealogy of all the tribes of Israel including a genealogy of Lehi's own ancestors, revealing him to be a descendant of Joseph, son of the patriarch Jacob.

After reading the contents of the brass plates, Lehi prophesied that they would "never be dimmed any more by time," and that they would ultimately "go forth unto all nations, kindreds, tongues, and people who were of his seed."

Sword of Laban
When Nephi encountered the unconscious Laban, he noticed that Laban was wearing a fine sword made of "precious steel" with a hilt of "pure gold."  After slaying Laban, Nephi took this sword for himself.  He would later use it as a model for manufacturing similar weapons for his people's defense.

Apparently Laban's sword was passed down through the centuries to future prophets, kings, and warriors, as it is mentioned many centuries later in the Book of Mormon.

Book of the Law of the Lord
James J. Strang, one of several contenders to succeed Joseph Smith during the 1844 succession crisis, asserted that he had been given the "Plates of Laban" in fulfillment of Lehi's prophecy.  His translation of selections from them was published in 1851 as The Book of the Law of the Lord: Being a Translation from the Egyptian of the Law Given to Moses in Sinai.  In its preface, Strang clearly identifies the "Plates of Laban" as the source for most of his book.

Strang's Book of the Law comprises a constitution for a Mormon monarchy, wherein the Prophet-leader of the Latter Day Saint church equally rules as king over God's kingdom on earth.  His 1856 expanded version also contains other revelations and teachings by Strang to enhance understanding of the work.  The Book of the Law was seen by Strang as making up only a portion of the Plates of Laban, rather than the whole, showing that it was a more complete bible that included books now lost. The Book of Mormon also claims this in reference to works by Zenos and Zenock, prophets who lived in Jerusalem, but are now unknown to history.

Seven witnesses testified to having seen and handled the plates Strang claimed to possess.  They described the plates as being eighteen in number, each measuring approximately seven and three-eighths inches wide, by nine inches long.  The plates themselves were "occasionally embellished with beautiful pictures," and all appeared to be of "beautiful antique workmanship, bearing a striking resemblance to the ancient oriental languages."

The subsequent history of Strang's "Plates of Laban," and their current whereabouts, is a mystery.

The Book of the Law of the Lord is not viewed as sacred scripture to the Church of Jesus Christ of Latter-day Saints or the Community of Christ, the two largest factions of the Latter Day Saint movement. The Community of Christ (then the Reorganized Church of Jesus Christ of Latter Day Saints) was formed under Joseph Smith III and was primarily composed of former followers of Strang. These Latter Day Saints held the book as sacred until Strang's works were official decanonized due to persecution and the scandal surrounding Strang's polygamy.

Book of Mormon Movie
In The Book of Mormon Movie, adapted from First and Second Nephi, Laban was portrayed by the actor Michael Flynn.

The film was rated PG-13 by American censors for "a scene of violence", having contained an image of Nephi with blood splattered on his face after beheading Laban. This image was removed for home media releases, and the film received a PG rating.

The film was widely panned by Mormon and non-Mormon critics. The Austin Chronicle wrote of "Michael Flynn turning in a ripping good Edward G. Robinson impersonation as the villainous Laban."

See also

 Book of Mormon chronology
 List of plates (Latter Day Saint movement)

References

Further reading
 
 John W. Welch, "Legal Perspectives on the Slaying of Laban" Journal of Book of Mormon Studies 1/1 (1992): 119-41.
Brett L. Holbrook,  "The Sword of Laban as a Symbol of Divine Authority and Kingship," Journal of Book of Mormon Studies 2/1 (1993)
Val Larsen, "Killing Laban: The Birth of Sovereignty in the Nephite Constitutional Order" Journal of Book of Mormon Studies 16/1 (2007)

External links
 LDS research articles on the Sword of Laban
 References to Laban in the index to the LDS edition of The Book of Mormon
 References to brass plates in the index to the LDS edition of The Book of Mormon
 Book of the Law of the Lord, Being a Translation from the Egyptian of the Law Given to Moses in Sinai. The Royal Press, St. James, 1856.

Book of Mormon people